Jonathan Viera Ramos (born 21 October 1989) is a Spanish professional footballer who plays as a left winger or an attacking midfielder for UD Las Palmas.

Club career

Las Palmas

Born in Las Palmas, Viera finished his youth career with hometown's UD Las Palmas, where he earned the nickname Romário. He made his senior debut with the reserve team, appearing in ten Segunda División B games in the 2008–09 season and suffering relegation. On 18 February 2010, he renewed his contract until June 2013.

Viera was definitely promoted to the main squad for 2010–11, as the team competed in the Segunda División. He finished the campaign with 31 matches (26 starts) and six goals, including three in a 5–3 away win against FC Barcelona B on 15 May 2011, which all but certified the Canary Islands side's permanence.

In January 2012, amidst rumours of a transfer – Las Palmas inclusively had everything arranged with Granada CF but the deal eventually fell through – Viera assured he would stay with his club until the end of the season. He finished as the second-best top scorer in the squad at nine, only trailing another youth graduate, Vitolo, by one goal.

Valencia
On 6 May 2012, one month before the Las Palmas season ended, Viera signed with La Liga's Valencia CF for five years and €2.5 million. He made his official debut against FC Barcelona, playing 13 minutes of a 1–0 away loss.

Viera scored his first goal in the top flight on 29 September 2012, closing the 2–0 home victory over Real Zaragoza. On 30 August of the following year, he was loaned to Madrid-based Rayo Vallecano in a season-long move without the option of making the deal permanent afterwards.

Standard Liège
On 1 September 2014, Viera cut ties with Valencia, immediately joining Standard Liège. He appeared in only seven competitive matches during his spell in Belgium, scoring in a 2–1 group stage defeat at Feyenoord in the UEFA Europa League.

Return to Las Palmas
On 14 January 2015, Viera was loaned to Las Palmas until June. He contributed seven goals in 21 appearances, as his team returned to the top division after a 13-year absence.

Viera signed a permanent three-year deal on 14 July 2015, for €900,000.

Beijing Guoan
On 19 February 2018, Viera joined Chinese Super League club Beijing Sinobo Guoan F.C. on a four-year contract for a fee of around €11 million. The player acknowledged the transfer "took care" of his future, and Las Palmas retained a buy-back option in the future. On 7 April 2019, he was named the competition's Player of the Month for the previous month. 

Viera completed the second hat-trick of his career on 28 April 2019, by scoring three goals in a 4–1 home defeat of Dalian Yifang F.C. in the domestic league. In August, he was loaned to Las Palmas until the end of the year.

Third spell at Las Palmas
On 23 August 2021, Viera returned to Las Palmas on a five-year contract.

International career
Viera played once with the Spain under-21s, featuring the last minutes of the 1–1 friendly draw with Belarus in Alcalá de Henares. On 9 October 2017, as the full side had already qualified as group champions for the 2018 FIFA World Cup, manager Julen Lopetegui handed him his debut, and he played the entire 1–0 away win over Israel.

Career statistics

Honours
Beijing Guoan
Chinese FA Cup: 2018

Individual
Segunda División Player of the Month: May 2015, December 2019, May 2022, October 2022
Chinese FA Cup Top goalscorer: 2018

Notes

References

External links

1989 births
Living people
Spanish footballers
Footballers from Las Palmas
Association football midfielders
Association football wingers
La Liga players
Segunda División players
Segunda División B players
Tercera División players
UD Las Palmas Atlético players
UD Las Palmas players
Valencia CF players
Rayo Vallecano players
Belgian Pro League players
Standard Liège players
Chinese Super League players
Beijing Guoan F.C. players
Spain under-21 international footballers
Spain international footballers
Spanish expatriate footballers
Expatriate footballers in Belgium
Expatriate footballers in China
Spanish expatriate sportspeople in Belgium
Spanish expatriate sportspeople in China
Articles containing video clips